Hanbat National University (HBNU) is a university in Daejon, South Korea, established in 1927.

The university is composed of six colleges, and different departments within them, and one separate faculty. All five colleges offer study at the undergraduate and graduate levels.

Hanbat National University has been chosen for the nationwide-level projects an Autonomous Improvement University Project, Leaders in Industry-University Cooperation+ (LINC+), the Project to Nurture Universities to Lead Start-ups, and Management of Systematic Career System for students.

Colleges
College of Engineering: five departments
 Department of Mechanical Engineering
 Department of Advanced Materials Engineering
 Department of Chemistry and Biological Engineering
 Department of Industrial Management Engineering
 Department of Building Services Engineering

College of Information Technology: four departments
 Department of Electrical Engineering
 Department of Electronics and Control Engineering
 Department of Computer Engineering
 Department of Information Communications Engineering

College of Construction, Environment and Design: six departments 
 Department of Civil and Environmental Engineering
 Department of Architectural Engineering 
 Department of Architectural Design
 Department of Urban Engineering
 Department of Visual Communication Design
 Department of Industrial Design

College of Humanities: three departments
 Department of English Language and Literature
 Department of Japanese
 Department of Chinese

College of Business and Economics: two departments
 Department of Economics
 Department of Business Administration and Accounting

College of Life-long Education

Faculty of Basic Convergence Education

Research institutes
 Institute of Construction Safety Technology
 Urban and Environment Research Institute
 Energy and Clean Technology Research Center
 Institute of Fusion Technology for Production
 Institute of Environmental Preservation and Disaster Prevention
 Wireless Communication Research Institute
 Institute of Environment and Ecological Restoration
 Human-centered Future Fusion Center
 Institute of Quality Innovation
 Institute of Production and Environmental Design
 Appropriate Technology Institute
 China Trade Strategy Institute
 Urban Architecture Center
 Institute of Korean Language and Culture
 Institute of Advanced Renewable Energy
 Railway Technology Center
 Design Future Vision Center
 U-city Cluster Institute
 Public Design Institute
 Future Convergence Center for Humans
 Research Center of Optimal Technology
 Institute of Cultural Contents Technology
 Entrepreneurial Research Center of Industry-University Connection

External links

See also
List of colleges and universities in South Korea
Education in South Korea

Universities and colleges in Daejeon
National universities and colleges in South Korea
Educational institutions established in 1927
1927 establishments in Korea